Camajuaní is a municipality and town in the Villa Clara Province of Cuba.

History

In 1819 was decided the construction of a new port in near Caibarién to replace an old one located in Tesisco. From that moment, settlers established in the surroundings creating a new village. In 1832 blueprints for the new town of Caibarien were presented, and finally in 1841 this city was founded. Consequently, in 1864 an extension of the railway was planned in order to bring the sugar from the Camajuani valley to Caibarien and a new settlement began near the train station. This is the starting point and birth of Camajuaní village.

January 1, 1871 Camajuani was declared a «villa» and on August 1, 1879 the city hall was established. The first mayor of the villa was Hipólito Escobar Martelo. 

In the 1907 census Zulueta, which was a barrio at the time was switched from being a part of the municipality of Camajuaní to Remedios.

Geography

Camajuaní is located in a valley, surrounded by an old range. Predominantly the city lies in a flat terrain. With the same name, the Camajuani river passes near the city, and Sagua la Chica river also passes through the region, playing both an important role in the fertility of the municipality.

The municipality is divided into 13 consejos populares (i.e. "popular councils"): the main town of Camajuaní (municipal seat, divided in C. I and C. II), and the villages of Aguada de Moya, José María Pérez, La Quinta, Luis Arcos Bergnes (or Carmita), Sabana, Sagua la Chica, San Antonio de las Vueltas (or Vueltas), Taguayabón, Vega Alta , Batalla de Santa Clara and Vega de Palma.

Demographics
In 2004, the municipality of Camajuaní had a population of 63,544.

Economy

Main economic activity is agricultural in nature, sugarcane and high quality tobacco have been key.

The foundation of the town was a natural consequence of the establishment of train station constructed by "Ferrocarriles Unidos de Caibarién", (United Railways of Caibarién) in 1864, this node connected the valley where the city now is with the port in Caibarien at the North, Santa Clara on the South, Vega Alta and Placetas west and east respectively. The valley soon gain agricultural importance with important productions of Tobacco and Sugar. Most of the biggest sugar mills in the island were located in the Camajuani region, and its productions were exported to the rest of the country and the world using this port located in the near coastal city of Caibarien.

Tourism
Camajuaní along with Remedios, Vueltas, Taguayabón and Caibarien, all located in the same region and just few kilometers from one each other are famous due to the parrandas, a carnival like party with origins date back to the 18th century. Every Parranda has its own difference in every town, but they share some similarities as well; like division of the population in two neighborhoods that compete each year in best decorative flat, plaza works or "Wall of lights" (a structure meant to support a display of lights or fireworks), traditional dance and fireworks display. In the case of Camajuani the city is divided in Chivos (Goats) and Sapos (Toads).

See also
Municipalities of Cuba
List of cities in Cuba

References
Camajuaní, Land of Valley and Sprees

External links

 Camajuaní - culture and heritage (Dirección Municipal de Cultura)
 Camajuaní on EcuRed
 Camajuaní, Land of Valleys and Sprees, Joven Club de Computación de Camajuaní
 

Populated places in Villa Clara Province
1864 establishments in North America
Populated places established in 1864
1864 establishments in the Spanish Empire